Col. Salvador Abcede (1914 – August 19, 1982) was the leader of the anti-Japanese guerrilla group on Negros. He operated in the mountains of Tanjay, Negros Oriental and later moved to the mountains of Dumaguete by the invitation of Silliman University ROTC group who also joined the soldiers under the USAFFE 71st Division during the Japanese Invasion and led guerrilla moves against the Japanese.

He was joined by the troops of the Philippine Expeditionary Forces to Korea (PEFTOK) and led the honored heroes from the Battle of Hill Eerie in 1952. Which led to Lieutenant Fidel V. Ramos, other Filipino officers and all troops with aiding American forces of the 45th Infantry Division units in fighting against the Chinese Communist forces under the People's Volunteer Army during the Korean War. He died of cirrhosis of the liver at Veterans Medical Center.

Awards and decorations
Distinguished Service Cross
Legion of Merit
Philippine Independence Medal
Philippine Liberation Medal
Philippine Defense Medal
Resistance Movement Medal (Philippines)

See also
List of American guerrillas in the Philippines

References

1914 births
1982 deaths
Philippine Army personnel
Filipino guerrillas
Deaths from cirrhosis
Recipients of the Distinguished Service Cross (United States)
Recipients of the Legion of Merit